Dollybirds is a 1997 Hungarian comedy musical film directed by Péter Tímár.

Synopsis
In the August of 1962, the Hungarian Young Communist League announces that the winner of the annual Ki mit tud? talent show will earn a trip to the 8th World Festival of Youth and Students in Helsinki; sensing a chance to defect communist Hungary, Attila decides to win the contest by putting a band together. With varying levels of support from the local residents, he assembles a ragtag band, and enters the contest. They reach the finals, but before they'd get a chance to perform on stage, an encounter with a stagehand reveals to them that the contest is fixed and that the winners have already been picked; the band sadly departs without ever going on stage.

Cast 
 János Gálvölgyi - Uncle Simon
 Sándor Almási - Attila
 Anita Tóth - Angéla
 Gábor Reviczky - Cézár
  - Margit
 Ildikó Tóth - Olga

Production 
Like Sound Eroticism, Tímár applied unusual filming techniques: he recorded the actors reciting the dialogue first, which he'd then either slow down or speed up and replay during shooting, making the actors act out the scenes either faster or slower than their natural tempo.

References

External links 

1997 comedy films
1997 films
Hungarian comedy films